Fábio José Ferreira Pacheco (born 26 May 1988) is a Portuguese footballer who plays for Moreirense F.C. as a defensive midfielder.

He made over 150 Primeira Liga appearances for Paços de Ferreira, Vitória Setúbal, Marítimo and Moreirense, and also surpassed a century of appearances in the second tier for Oliveirense, Tondela and Moreirense.

Club career

Paços Ferreira
Born in Paredes, Porto District, Pacheco spent his entire youth career with F.C. Paços de Ferreira, and had three loans to Rebordosa A.C. of the fourth division. He made his professional and Primeira Liga debut on 10 May 2009 near the end of the season, as an 88th-minute substitute for Cristiano in a 2–1 home win against C.S. Marítimo.

In August 2010, Pacheco and teammate Carlitos were loaned to Segunda Liga side U.D. Oliveirense.

Tondela
In July 2011, Pacheco was loaned to C.D. Tondela for the upcoming campaign in the third-tier. After being promoted as runners-up to Varzim S.C. he rescinded his contract with his parent club and signed permanently.

Pacheco scored five goals in 2012–13, starting with a 2–0 home victory over F.C. Penafiel on 24 November 2012. He added a brace on 29 December, in a 3–1 defeat of C.S. Marítimo B also at the Estádio João Cardoso.

Vitória Setúbal
On 9 June 2015, having contributed 32 matches and three goals to another promotion as champions, Pacheco signed a two-year deal at top-flight Vitória F.C. under his former manager Quim Machado. In his second appearance, on 24 August, he was sent off in a 4–0 win at Académica de Coimbra, and on 18 September he received a straight red card in the first minute for conceding a penalty with a foul on Henrique Dourado which the Vitória S.C. player converted in the 2–2 draw at the Estádio do Bonfim.

Pacheco scored his first goal in the Portuguese top tier on 25 October 2015, to conclude a 2–0 win away to Moreirense FC.

Marítimo
Pacheco agreed to a three-year contract with Marítimo 10 June 2017, on a three-year deal as their first signing of the transfer window. On 21 October, away to his former employers, he was sent off in the 65th minute with his team winning 1–0, eventually falling 3–1. On 18 December, he scored the equaliser in a 3–1 loss away to eventual champions FC Porto.

Pacheco played precisely half of the Madeirans games that season (22 in all competitions), being suspended in March 2018 by chairman Carlos Pereira after an alleged subpar performance in the 5–0 defeat against S.L. Benfica.

Moreirense
On 6 June 2018, Pacheco signed a two-year deal with Moreirense, having rescinded his link to Marítimo. He was sent off again on his return to Setúbal on 3 August the following year, in the 35th minute of a 1–0 loss in the second round of the Taça da Liga. On 23 February 2020 he scored his first goal for the team from Moreira de Cónegos, the winner in a 2–1 home victory over C.D. Santa Clara.

In June 2021, with his contract due to expire, Pacheco renewed for two more years.

References

External links

Portuguese League profile 

1988 births
Living people
People from Paredes, Portugal
Sportspeople from Porto District
Portuguese footballers
Association football midfielders
Primeira Liga players
Liga Portugal 2 players
Segunda Divisão players
F.C. Paços de Ferreira players
Rebordosa A.C. players
U.D. Oliveirense players
C.D. Tondela players
Vitória F.C. players
C.S. Marítimo players
Moreirense F.C. players